Dubuque may refer to:

Places
United States
 Dubuque, Iowa
 Dubuque County, Iowa
 Dubuque, Kansas
 East Dubuque, Illinois
 University of Dubuque

Other
 Dubuque (surname)
 USS Dubuque